Hare is an unincorporated community in Williamson County, Texas, United States.

Etymology
It is uncertain where the town's name originated from. Two theories are that it is named from the large amount of rabbits in the area, and that the town was nicknamed "Fuzzy". Other sources say that it was named after pioneers whose surname was Hare.

Demographics
The town had a population of 15 in 1933, and 70 from 1940 until 2000.

References 

Unincorporated communities in Williamson County, Texas
Unincorporated communities in Texas